Life Dances On or Christine or Dance Program (French: Un carnet de bal) is a 1937 French drama film directed by Julien Duvivier and starring Marie Bell, Françoise Rosay and Louis Jouvet. It was partly shot at the Neuilly Studios in Paris. The film's art direction was by Jean Douarinou. Duvivier's American film Lydia (1941) is to some extent a remake of this one.

Plot
Twenty years after her debut ball when she was sixteen years old, recently widowed Christine is disposing of papers and other effects belonging to her late husband.  Living in a mansion on an Italian lake, she has had a comfortable and affluent but unfulfilling life.  Coming across her dance card from that debut ball, she gets lost in nostalgic memories of that night, and decides to find out what has happened to the dance partners who signed that card.

Her beaus, living in different locations throughout France, have generally not fared well, with lives that range from the tragic to the comic to the ordinary, often combined in some measure. One killed himself over Christine, and his doting mother haunts his room in a perpetual state of denial. Promising lawyer and poet Pierre became a cynical nightclub owner and mob boss. An older composer took monastic vows and now teaches music to choirboys. The relatively fit and well-adjusted bachelor Eric has secluded himself on a mountain, devoted to his privacy and the town's ski rescue crew. Francois is a petit-bourgeois mayor who is marrying his henpecked maid in a small village and has an adopted son involved in petty crime. A former medical student is a world-weary, drug-addicted wreck performing illegal abortions in the dockyard district. Optimistic card-trick-loving Fabien is a hair-dresser well-contented with his domestic life (perhaps closeted) and frequenting the same old dance circuit in their home town.

When Fabien invites Christine to the town's ball, she accepts, hoping to recapture the magic of the night she remembers, but she is surprised to find that the magical room and dancers of her memory are just ordinary people in a banal setting.  She is ruefully amused when a sixteen-year old girl talks to her about how entrancing the setting and the night seem to her, and she leaves early.

Christine indulges in the melancholy of regret, remaining non-judgmental, but nevertheless disturbed by the profound effect she had on these men, their loss of innocence, and the ravages of time, but she is still curious about Gerard, the one former suitor she has not been able to find.  A friend informs her that Gerard has been living just across the lake from her for the last fifteen years.  Taking a boat to the other side, Christine encounters a young man, looking much like her memories of Gerard.  His father, however, has recently died and the estate is being sold to someone else.  In a final scene, the young man, dressed for a formal ball, addresses Christine as his step-mother and they leave together.

Cast
 Harry Baur as Alain Regnault  
 Marie Bell as Christine Surgère  
 Pierre Blanchar as Thierry Raynal  
 Fernandel as Fabien Coutissol  
 Louis Jouvet as Pierre Verdier, dit Jo  
 Raimu as Francois Patusset  
 Françoise Rosay as Marguerite Audié  
 Pierre Richard-Willm as Eric Irvin  
 Maurice Bénard as Brémond  
 Robert Lynen as Jacques Dambreval  
 Milly Mathis as Cécile Galtéry  
 Sylvie as La maîtresse de Thierry  
 Andrex as Paul  
 Jeanne Fusier-Gir as La marchande de journaux 
 Alfred Adam as Fred  
 Pierre Alcover as Teddy Mélanco  
 Jacques Beauvais as Le maître d'hôtel  
 Peggy Bonny as L'entraîneuse  
 Serge de Landauer 
 Georges Dorival as Le baron  
 Crista Dorra 
 Marguerite Ducouret as La mère de la jeune fille au bal  
 Agnès Duval as La serveuse du repas de noces  
 Gabrielle Fontan as Rose, la bonne de Mme Audié  
 Simone Gauthier as La jeune fille au bal  
 René Génin as L'adjoint du maire  
 Roger Legris as Un complice de Jo  
 Raymond Narlay as Un dîneur chez Jo 
 Henri Nassiet as Un policier  
 Henri Niel as Un invité chez Patusset  
 Les Petits Chanteurs à la Croix de Bois as Les petits chanteurs de la manécanterie  
 Sylvain as Un danseur  
 Janine Zorelli

Reception 
Writing for Night and Day in 1937, Graham Greene gave the film a good review, characterizing it as "a film which must be seen [...] [as] it contains the finest French acting". Greene notes that to the extent that "the mood is meant to be autumnal", director Duvivier fails to capture it and whenever the widow appears, "illusion rocks like stage scenery". Despite this, Greene finds that "each episode is beautifully acted and directed", and he concludes that "there has been nothing to equal this episode on the screen since Pépé.

In a short article featuring eleven still photographs from the film, Life magazine declared "With no love interest or spectacle, a middle-aged heroine and an episodic plot, it is the kind of movie which Hollywood never makes.  The loss is Hollywood's, for this French picture is one of the year's best in any language."

References

Bibliography 
 Moeller, Felix. The Film Minister: Goebbels and the Cinema in the Third Reich. Axel Menges, 2000.

External links 
 

1937 films
French drama films
1937 drama films
1930s French-language films
Films directed by Julien Duvivier
French black-and-white films
1930s French films
Films shot at Neuilly Studios